Hernando de Ávila (c.1538-1595), painter and sculptor to Philip II of Spain, flourished in the middle of the 16th century. He was a pupil of Francisco Comontes. He executed, in 1568, an altar-piece of 'St. John the Baptist,' and the 'Adoration of the Kings,' for the cathedral of Toledo.

Philip II of Spain would order to him of pictures of the book Libro de Retratos de Reyes..., signboards and real standards of the kings of Oviedo, Leon and Castile, possibly his last work and unique remaining testimony of the decoration of the hall, destroyed in 1860 by derrumbre of his ceiling. Conserved in the Museum of the Prado, he consists of 77 folios in paper verjurado with pictures of the kings of Oviedo, Leon and Castile, shields of arms, signboards and a genealogical tree. Dead Hernando de Ávila in Madrid in buried March 1595 and in the parish of San Sebastián, its widow received in April 1596 five hundred duchies by this book “illuminated of colors” and other, lost, of only drawings of the same subject.

References
 Ceán Bermúdez, Juan Agustín, Dictionary of the most distinguished teachers of the Fine Arts in Spain, Madrid, 1800.
 Collar de Cáceres, Painting in the former diocese of Segovia, 1500–1631, Segovia 1989 Segovia Provincial Excellency, 
 Collar de Cáceres, Fernando, "Around Portraits Book of Hernando de Avila", Bulletin of the Prado Museum, IV, 10 (1983), p. 7-35.
 Paredes Gonzalez, Jerome, "Two choir thumbnails Hernando de Ávila escurialenses inspired by Titian: All Saints and The Martyrdom of St. Lawrence", the cult of saints, guilds, devotion, parties and art Escurialense Institute of Historical Research and Artistic Works, El Escorial, 2008, 

'''Attribution:
 

Year of birth unknown
Year of death unknown
People from Toledo, Spain
16th-century Spanish sculptors
Spanish male sculptors
16th-century Spanish painters
Spanish male painters
Year of birth uncertain